Gordonia iterans is a bacterium from the genus Gordonia which has been isolated from a patient with pneumonia.

References

Further reading 

Mycobacteriales
Bacteria described in 2014